The Afon Marteg is a river in Powys, Wales.

It is about 15 km long, flowing roughly south-west to join the Wye at Pont Marteg (grid reference SN952714) about 5 km above Rhayader.

Fishing is available, with appropriate permits, for brown trout, chub, dace, grayling and pike. The river has a run of spawning Atlantic salmon in the autumn.

References

Rivers of Powys